Pyrpotyra capixaba is a species of beetle in the family Cerambycidae. It was described by Santos-Silva, Martins and Clarke in 2010.

References

Rhinotragini
Beetles described in 2010